Francis Kwasi Buor is a Ghanaian politician. He is the member of parliament that represented Offinso South constituency in the Ashanti Region of Ghana in the 2nd Parliament of the 4th Republic of Ghana on the ticket of the New Patriotic Party.

Politics 
Francis Kwasi Buor career began when he represented for the first time during the 1996 Ghanaian general election with 17,077 votes. He took the seat from Kenneth Amponsah-Yiadom of the National Democratic Congress (NDC).He was succeeded in office by Kwabena Sarfo of the New Patriotic Party.

Personal life 
He is a Christian.

References 

Ashanti Region
Ghanaian MPs 1997–2001
New Patriotic Party politicians
Living people
Year of birth missing (living people)